Bergman: A Year in a Life, Swedish: Bergman - ett år, ett liv, is a 2018 Swedish-Norwegian documentary film directed by Jane Magnusson. Journeying through 1957, the year Ingmar Bergman released two of his most acclaimed features (The Seventh Seal and Wild Strawberries), made a TV film (Mr. Sleeman Is Coming) and directed four plays for theatre (The Misanthrope, Counterfeiters, The Prisoner, Peer Gynt), Magnusson has amassed a wealth of archive and contemporary interviews, along with a selection of clips from his vast body of work. Film has its premiere on 71st Cannes Film Festival.

Cast
 Ingmar Bergman - Himself (archive footage)
 Lena Endre - Herself
 Thorsten Flinck - Himself
 Elliott Gould - Himself
 Jane Magnusson - Narrator (voice)
 Barbra Streisand - Herself
 Liv Ullmann - Herself
 Lars von Trier - Himself
 Bibi Andersson - Sara (archive footage)
 Bengt Ekerot - Death (archive footage)
 Inga Landgré - Nelly (archive footage)
 Gösta Roosling - Himself (archive footage)
 Victor Sjöström - Dr. Eberhard Isak Borg (archive footage)
 Roy Andersson -Himself
 Dick Cavett - Himself
 Gösta Ekman - Himself
 Holly Hunter - Herself
 John Landis - Himself
 Gunnel Lindblom -Herself
 Jan Troell - Himself
 Yimou Zhang - Himself

Awards and accolades

References

External links
 
 CinEuropa

Ingmar Bergman
Biographical documentary films
2018 documentary films
2018 films
Swedish documentary films
Norwegian documentary films
European Film Awards winners (films)
2010s Swedish films